Rangrazan-e Vosta (also Romanized as Rangrazān-e Vosţá and Rangrazān-e Vasaţī) is a village in Qaedrahmat Rural District, Zagheh District, Khorramabad County, Lorestan Province, Iran. At the 2006 census, its population was 170, in 39 families.

References 

Towns and villages in Khorramabad County